The 107th Aviation Regiment is an aviation regiment of the United States Army, primarily provided by the Army National Guard. The 1st Battalion, 107th Aviation, is an air operations battalion in the Tennessee Army National Guard. It is part of the 30th Troop Command. In August 2021, they were deployed to the Horn of Africa.

References 

Aviation regiments of the United States Army